General elections were held in El Salvador on 20 March 1994, with a second round of the presidential elections taking place on 24 April. Armando Calderón Sol of the Nationalist Republican Alliance won the presidential elections, whilst his party also won the legislative elections. Voter turnout was 52.27% in the first round of the presidential elections and 45.51% in the second, whilst it was 53.08% for the legislative election.

Results

President

Legislative Assembly

References

El Salvador
Legislative elections in El Salvador
1994 in El Salvador
Presidential elections in El Salvador